Loquito por ti (English: Crazy About You), is a Colombian telenovela that premiered on Caracol Televisión on 10 October 2018. The telenovela is  based on the life of Colombian tropical music singers, Rodolfo Aicardi, and Gustavo "El Loko" Quintero.

Plot 
The series revolves around the life of Camilo and Juancho, two friends who work in the Maestro Guzmán's orchestra, both share the dream of one day becoming the most recognized musicians in the tropical genre. In this long journey to fulfill their dream, they meet Daniela, a woman of good economic position who wants to be famous and live music as they do. Daniela will have to hide from her family that she is part of a musical orchestra, and Camilo and Juancho that she is from a family of high social class. But everything gets complicated when Camilo and Juancho fall in love with Daniela, that's when their friendship and dreams of being famous will be truncated by the love of a woman.

Cast 
 Mariana Gómez as Daniela Botero
 Variel Sánchez as Camilo Arango
 Sebastián Carvajal as Juan Nepomuseno "Juancho" Argote
 María Camila Giraldo como Estela Rendón "Estelita"
 Danielle Arciniegas as Janeth Arango 
 Pillao Rodriguez as German
 Linda Lucía Callejas as Maruja de Arango
 Luces Velásquez as Josefina 
 Sebastián Giraldo as Charlie 
 Carla Giraldo as Rosario
 Julián Caicedo as Jorge Eliécer Gómez Espitia "Machorro"
 Sebastián Boscán as Nicolás Botero
 Freddy Ordóñez as Sacerdote Facundo
 Ricardo Mejía as Héctor Jaramillo
 Juan Carlos Coronel as Doctor
 Daniela Tapia as Tamara
 Kimberly Reyes as Perla
 Patricia Ercole as Rebeca
 Carmenza Cossio as Julia Rendón
 César Mora as El Maestro Orestes Guzmán
 José Rojas as Rafael Dangond
 Cristian Villamil as El Choper
 Anddy Caicedo as Romero
 Martha Restrepo as Bárbara Uribe
 Lina Cardona as Silvia
 Quique Mendoza as Arturo Vidal
 Henry Montealegre as Luis
 Alfredo Gutiérrez as Maestro Migue
 Santiago Moure as Polidoro Uribe
Edinson Gil as Henry

References

External links 
 

2018 telenovelas
Spanish-language telenovelas
Colombian telenovelas
2018 Colombian television series debuts
2019 Colombian television series endings
Caracol Televisión telenovelas
Television shows set in Colombia